5th Rifle Division may refer to:

5th Rifle Division (Poland)
5th Rifle Division (Soviet Union)
5th Siberian Rifle Division